The 2010 Movistar Open was a men's tennis tournament played on outdoor clay courts. It was the 16th edition of the Chile Open, and was part of the ATP World Tour 250 series of the 2010 ATP World Tour. It took place in Chicureo at the Santiago's commune of Colina from 1 February through 7 February 2010. Third-seeded Thomaz Bellucci won the singles title.

ATP entrants

Seeds

 Rankings are as of January 18, 2010

Other entrants
The following players received wildcards into the singles main draw:
  Jorge Aguilar
  Hans Podlipnik-Castillo
  Cristóbal Saavedra-Corvalán

The following players received entry from the qualifying draw:
  Juan-Martín Aranguren
  David Marrero
  Rubén Ramírez Hidalgo
  João Souza

Finals

Singles

 Thomaz Bellucci defeated  Juan Mónaco, 6–2, 0–6, 6–4
It was Bellucci's first title of the year and second of his career.

Doubles

 Łukasz Kubot/  Oliver Marach defeated  Potito Starace /  Horacio Zeballos, 6–4, 6–0.

References

External links
Official website

Chile Open (tennis)
Movistar Open
VTR Open